Jarma Toy Lewis (June 5, 1931 – November 12, 1985) was an American film actress and model active in the 1950s.

Biography
Jarma Lewis came from a family of Anglo-Irish ancestry, attended Los Angeles City College. She first appeared in school theater productions and received her acting training at the Neighborhood Playhouse School in New York. 

In the early 1950s, she played her first film roles. Lewis worked as a receptionist at a Beverly Hills dentist's office and was discovered by director Henry Hathaway, who cast her to play Queen Guinevere in his knight film Prince Valiant. She was subsequently employed as a starlet and up-and-coming actress at 20th Century Fox (1954) and MGM (1955-57). Together with Taina Elg and Luana Leeshe she was one of the youngest performers signed to MGM at the time. She first worked with directors such as Curt Siodmak, Otto Preminger, Stanley Donen, Richard Thorpe, and later with Vincente Minnelli and Edward Dmytryk. Lewis was seen in different genres such as comedy, thriller, crime, drama, and historical films.

Lewis has also had episode roles in a number of TV series and guest appearances on TV shows.

Lewis turned to writing in the 1970s and served on the board of directors of the UCLA Art Council for 15 years. She died in November 1985 at the age of 54 at her home in Beverly Hills.

Personal life
In November 1955, she married the industrial magnate Benjamin Edward Bensinger III, whose family had made fortune by selling and installing bowling alleys. The couple honeymooned in South America and then settled in Los Angeles. The marriage, which ended in divorce in October 1984, produced three sons.

Filmography

Feature films
Raintree County (1957) as Barbara Drake
The Conqueror (1956) as Girl in bath
The Tender Trap (1955) as Jessica [Collins]
Women's Prison (1955) as Prisoner
The Cobweb (1955) as Lois Y. Demuth
It's a Dog's Life (1955) as Mabel Maycroft
The Marauders (1955) as Hannah Ferber
The Prodigal (1955) as Uba
Woman's World (1954) as Woman in bargain basement
Prince Valiant (1954) as Queen Guinevere
River of No Return (1954) as Dancer
The French Line (1954) as Model
Seven Brides for Seven Brothers (1954) as Lem's girlfriend
The Magnetic Monster (1953) as Stewardess
April in Paris (1953) as Chorine
The WAC from Walla Walla (1952) as Specialist

References

External links

 
 

1931 births
1985 deaths
20th-century American actresses
American female models
American film actresses
American television actresses